The Malaysian Masters was a golf tournament that was held in Malaysia from 1988 until 1992. In 1991 and 1992, it was part of the PGA Tour of Australasia schedule as the tour sought to expand into Southeast Asia, and as a result carried world ranking points in those years.

The tournament was founded in 1988 and had the richest purse in the region for an event outside of the Asia Golf Circuit, with hopes that it would become one of the biggest tournaments in Asia. In 1993, having been part of the Australasian Tour for two seasons, the tournament was cancelled as the tour worked towards closer ties with the Asia Golf Circuit.

Winners

See also
Malaysian Dunlop Masters
Pulai Springs Malaysian Masters
Volvo Masters of Malaysia

Notes

References

Former PGA Tour of Australasia events
Golf tournaments in Malaysia
Recurring sporting events established in 1988
Recurring sporting events disestablished in 1993